The Shire of Belyando was a local government area in Central Queensland, Australia.

The shire had two main towns, Clermont and Moranbah, and its economy was based on agriculture and mining. There are two coal mines in the area, one owned by BMA and one by Anglo Coal serviced by the town of Moranbah.

It is pronounced Bel-yando.

History

On 11 November 1879, the Belyando Division was established as one of 74 divisions around Queensland under the Divisional Boards Act 1879 with a population of 1494.

On 20 September 1884, Peak Downs Division was separated from the southern part of Belyando Division.

With the passage of the Local Authorities Act 1902, Belyando Division became Shire of Belyando on 31 March 1903.

As at 1966, the Belyando Shire Hall was at 21-23 Daintree Street.

On 15 March 2008, under the Local Government (Reform Implementation) Act 2007 passed by the Parliament of Queensland on 10 August 2007, Belyando merged with the Shires of Broadsound and Nebo to form the Isaac Region.

Towns and localities

The Shire of Belyando included the following settlements:

 Clermont
 Moranbah
 Belyando
 Elgin
 Frankfield
 Kilcummin
 Laglan
 Winchester

Chairmen

 1927: Anthony William Appleton. Gbg uoop

Population

References

External links

 

Former local government areas of Queensland
2008 disestablishments in Australia
Populated places disestablished in 2008
1879 establishments in Australia